Suzanne Lenglen and Elizabeth Ryan successfully defended their title, defeating Joan Austin and Evelyn Colyer in the final, 6–3, 6–1 to win the ladies' doubles tennis title at the 1923 Wimbledon Championships.

Draw

Finals

Top half

Section 1

The nationality of Mrs Herriot is unknown.

Section 2

The nationalities of Mrs G Gosling and Mrs D Harvey are unknown.

Bottom half

Section 3

Section 4

The nationality of Mrs van Praagh is unknown.

References

External links

Women's Doubles
Wimbledon Championship by year – Women's doubles
Wimbledon Championships - Doubles
Wimbledon Championships - Doubles